Amir Ahmad Nasr (Khartoum, 1986) is a Sudanese blogger and digital media and marketing consultant. He is the writer of an English-language blog, The Sudanese Thinker.

Early life and education
Born in Khartoum, Nasr was raised in Qatar and Malaysia. Raised by parents who were not particularly pious Muslims, he began his education at Islamic schools in Qatar and Kuala Lumpur, where the focus was on memorizing the Koran. He learned “that Jews drink the blood of children and conspire against Islam” and was taught “prayers calling for the destruction of the Jews.” He also learned English. Nasr became more and more devout as a result of his teachers' influence, but later, as a teenager in Kuala Lumpur, he encountered young liberal-minded Muslims online and in person and began to question his faith. He started his own blog, on which he recorded his shifting religious views.

He is currently pursuing a master’s in philosophy and researching the effect of new media on Islamic thought today.

Career
Nasr began writing his blog in 2006 because he felt that not enough Sudanese citizens were speaking out about Darfur. His blog helped encourage other people in Sudan to start English-language blogs. It also became a significance source of information for foreign journalists and audiences.

Originally, Nasr's blog was anonymous, but in 2011, during the Arab Spring, he revealed his identity. Since then he has become an author, activist, social entrepreneur, and human-rights advocate.

My Isl@m: How Fundamentalism Stole My Mind – And Doubt Freed My Soul
In 2013, he published his first book, My Isl@m: How Fundamentalism Stole My Mind—And Doubt Freed My Soul. In a starred review, Publishers Weekly praised the book for “seamlessly blend[ing] memoir with political thought and activism.” Author Clay Shirky has described the book as “a love letter to freedom of speech.” Another author, Ken Wilber, called it “an important and significant book.”

Other writings
In a June 2011 article for the Guardian, he wrote that the secession of what is now South Sudan would not end Sudan's “Afro-Arab identity crisis” or “magically turn the country into a genuinely Arab Islamic nation-state despite what Omar al-Bashir may want.” On the contrary, he wrote, “Sudan always has been and always will be a multi-ethnic, multi-religious melting pot.”

In January 2012, he wrote an article for Al Jazeera, titled "Reviving the "New Sudan vision. The article is about John Garang, the Southern Sudanese Christian rebel turned-statesmen.

In June 2012, he wrote an article for Foreign Policy entitled “Sudan Needs a Revolution.” He suggested that the tide was “shifting against Bashir,” and that “most Sudanese citizens aren’t yearning for more Islamism, but are instead focusing on and demanding better economic conditions, transparency, and accountability.” While “this battle will ultimately be fought and won by Sudanese, the international community also has an important role to play.”

Other professional activities
Nasr is a contributor to Global Voices Online. He organized The Future of Islam In the Age of New Media, an online audio seminar featuring 60 speakers. He is also a Havel Prize Committee member, helping to determine the winners of the  Václav Havel International Prize for Creative Dissent for The Human Rights Foundation.

Honors and awards
My Islam was listed In Foreign Policy's "What to Read in 2013," Nasr's blog was a three-times finalist for the Weblog Awards.

References

External links
Official website
Amir Ahmad Nasr - The Blog

1986 births
Living people
Sudanese bloggers
Sudanese human rights activists
Sudanese Muslims